Pool is the second studio album by New York-based musician Aaron Maine's Porches project. The albums basic tracking (drums/percussion, guitar and bass) at Business District Engineered by Hunter Davidsohn, finished by Maine in Maine's New York City apartment, and released on February 5, 2016 on Domino Records.

Critical reception

Pool received largely positive reviews from contemporary music critics. At Metacritic, which assigns a normalized rating out of 100 to reviews from mainstream critics, the album received an average score of 75, based on 15 reviews, which indicates "generally favorable reviews".

Jeremy Gordon of Pitchfork Media praised the album, stating, "Pool is an introspective record, tailormade for lonesome nights. It was made in Maine’s apartment, and while the record has a noticeably professional pop sheen, there are still vestigial hints of amateurism (such as the sound of fingers squeaking against the strings on album opener "Underwater") that convince me of its ideal setting. Anyone who lives in a city knows how easy it is to be pulled between lonely apartments and lonelier dance floors. By the end, the appeal of water becomes clear. You immerse yourself in it, disappearing from the rest of the world, but you’re still close to land."

Track listing

Personnel
Porches
 Aaron Maine – writing, performing, recording, production, engineering, photography
 Cameron Wisch – drums (3, 4, 8, 9, 12), performing
 Kevin Farrant – guitar (4, 8, 9), performing
 Maya Laner – vocals (8), performing
 Seiya Jewell – performing

Additional personnel
 Greta Kline – vocals (2, 3, 5), bass (4, 8, 9)
 Taylor Clay – saxophone (12)
 Hunter Davidsohn – live drums recording, additional guitars recording
 Adam Goldsmith - synthesizer, keyboards
 Christopher Daly – vocal recording (1, 3, 4)
 Chris Coady – mixing
 Greg Calbi – mastering
 Jessica Lehrman – cover photo photography

Charts

References

Porches (band) albums
2016 albums
Domino Recording Company albums